The 27th Luna Awards were held on July 10, 2011 at the Quezon City Sports Club and they honored the best Filipino films of the year 2008. It was delayed due to lack of government funding and was held together with the 29th Luna Awards.

The nominations were released on September 16, 2009. Baler received the most nominations with ten. Caregiver followed with nine.

The winners were announced beforehand on March 25, 2011. Baler dominated the ceremony by winning eight awards, including Best Picture.

Winners and nominees

Multiple nominations and awards

References

External links
 Official Website of the Film Academy of the Philippines

Luna Awards
2008 film awards
2011 in Philippine cinema